Stirling Transmitting Station is a transmission facility on Earl's Hill southwest of Stirling, Scotland.
Today the facility is used for cell phone transmitters.

References
 http://jproc.ca/hyperbolic/decca_north_british.html

Buildings and structures in Stirling (council area)